Afransi is a small town and is the capital of Gomoa East district in the Central Region of Ghana, Ghana.

References

Populated places in the Central Region (Ghana)